Canadian Pacific 2816, also known as the "Empress", is a preserved class "H-1b" 4-6-4 Hudson-type steam locomotive built by the Montreal Locomotive Works (MLW) in December 1930 for the Canadian Pacific Railway (CPR); the only non-streamlined H1 Hudson to have survived into preservation.

After being used for heavy passenger service, the locomotive was retired in 1960 and donated to Steamtown, U.S.A. at Bellows Falls, Vermont, in 1964. After an extensive restoration, the locomotive returned to service in 2001 and was used by the CPR in occasional excursion service until the discontinuation of the steam program in 2012, after which it remained stored in Calgary, Alberta, Canada. It was fired up briefly in 2020, and is undergoing overhaul for a return to service in 2023.

History

Revenue service
No. 2816 was one of ten H-1b-class (the "H" meant the 4-6-4 wheel configuration, the "1" was the design number and the "b" meant it was the second production run) 4-6-4 Hudson-type built by the Montreal Locomotive Works in December 1930. It was first assigned to the line between Winnipeg and Fort William, Ontario. Later, it was transferred to service between Windsor, Ontario, and Quebec City, and finally it ran a commuter train between Montreal and Rigaud, Quebec.

Steamtown ownership
In the early 1960s, F. Nelson Blount wanted to expand his Steamtown, U.S.A. collection, and one of the locomotives he wanted to preserve was a 4-6-4 from the New York Central Railroad (NYC). However, since all NYC 4-6-4s were scrapped by that time, Blount improvised by purchasing No. 2816 from the CPR in January 1964 as the only 4-6-4 in the collection. The locomotive was out on static display at Steamtown in Bellows Falls, Vermont, for several years before it was moved along with the rest of the collection in 1984 to Scranton, Pennsylvania, where the name was changed to Steamtown National Historic Site under the ownership of the National Park Service in 1986.

Restoration
In September 1998, the Canadian Pacific purchased No. 2816 after hearing of its availability from the crews who were running the Royal Hudson No. 2860, who had been looking for parts for 2860 and were offered the entire locomotive.

The locomotive was transported from Scranton to Montreal via Binghamton and Albany, New York, before being shipped cross country to the BC Rail steam shops in Vancouver for restoration. The locomotive was completely stripped down and rebuilt, "the most thorough rebuild undertaken on a steam locomotive in North America since the end of their era" according to CPR News. The restoration team was able to use over 800 technical drawings of CPR H1b class locomotives from the Canada Science and Technology Museum to completely restore 2816 to its 1950s appearance and to its original specifications. During restoration, the locomotive was converted to burn oil and equipped with modern amenities such as a radio and a diesel control unit. The restoration took over two years and cost over $2,000,000, making it one of the most costly locomotive restorations in Canada. CPR was confident in the restoration enough to announce on April 19, 2000, that 2816 would become an ambassador for the railway in the railway's new heritage steam program.

Excursion service
On August 16, 2001, restoration work was completed and the engine moved again under its own power for the first time in forty one years in a test run. In September 2001, the locomotive made its first trial run from the BC Rail steam shops to its new home of Calgary. It then rejoined the Canadian Pacific fleet as a special excursion locomotive and for public relations. Among other uses, No. 2816 is used to raise money for school lunch programs and the Children's Wish Foundation.

Between 2001 and 2012, No. 2816 travelled across Canada and the United States.

At the end of the 2008 season, Canadian Pacific put the steam program on hold (with exception of previously promised engagements) due to financial issues caused by the poor economy. No. 2816 did not operate at all in 2009, although the steam program was able to take advantage of this down time to do some extensive maintenance work on No. 2816 and its passenger car fleet. No. 2816 returned to operation on June 6, 2010. It was used in Rocky Mountain Express, a 2011 IMAX film which follows the locomotive on a journey from Vancouver to Montreal while telling the CPR's history.

In late 2012, Canadian Pacific CEO Fred Green stepped down and E. Hunter Harrison succeeded him. The latter had no interest in steam locomotive operations and discontinued the steam program, forcing No. 2816's excursion operations to be ceased and the locomotive placed in storage in Calgary. Even after Harrison stepped down in early 2017, being succeeded by Keith Creel, the engine remained in storage. On November 13, 2020, No. 2816 was fired up for a steam test and moved around the Calgary Yard with a railroad representative saying the test was to assess the engine's mechanical condition with "no plans to operate the engine on the main lines." It was subsequently announced that the locomotive would make a run as part of filming a Holiday Train video.

In 2021, Creel said that if the United States Surface Transportation Board approves the CPR's merger with the Kansas City Southern Railway, the railway would celebrate it by bringing No. 2816 back under steam to lead a tour from Calgary to Mexico City, making No. 2816 the first steam locomotive to run through Canada, the United States, and Mexico. Before this comes to fruition, however, No. 2816 is in need of an overhaul. It was announced that No. 2816 is planned to begin its tour in early 2023.

Preservation and other remaining H1 Hudsons
Of the five surviving Canadian Pacific Hudsons out of the original 65 built between 1929 and 1940, Nos. 2816 is the only survivor of the non-streamlined H1a and H1b classes built in 1929 and 1930 numbered 2800–2819. The four other remaining sister engines to 2816 are the semi-streamlined Royal Hudsons numbered 2820–2864. The remaining four Royal Hudsons are Nos. 2839 (H1c), 2850 and 2858 (both H1d) and the 2860 (H1e). Currently, Nos. 2816 and 2860 are the only two operating 4-6-4 Hudsons in North America; no American 4-6-4 Hudsons are operational.

Gallery

See also 

 Canadian Pacific 1201
 Canadian Pacific 1293
 Canadian Pacific 2317
 Canadian National 6060
 Union Pacific 844
 Southern Pacific 4449

References

External links
 Rocky Mountain Express
 CP 2816 Empress 

MLW locomotives
4-6-4 locomotives
2816
Individual locomotives of Canada
Preserved steam locomotives of Canada
Steam locomotives of Canada
Railway locomotives introduced in 1930
Standard gauge locomotives of Canada